Dragon Radio is a regional radio station, broadcasting to Wales on DAB. It is owned and operated by Nation Broadcasting.

As of December 2022, the station broadcasts to a weekly audience of 57,000, according to RAJAR.

References

External links

https://radiotoday.co.uk/2016/08/nation-broadcasting-to-launch-dragon-radio

Radio stations in Cardiff
Radio stations established in 2018
Rock radio stations in the United Kingdom